Talia Shapira (August 6, 1946 – January 24, 1992) was an Israeli actress, singer, comedian and writer.

Biography
Shapira was born in Ramat Gan. Her father was an electrician and her mother was a painter who died of cancer when Shapira was 16 years old. She studied at Renanim School of the Arts. After graduating, she joined up with the military band in the IDF and she performed at the Orna Porat Children's Theatre, the Haifa Theatre and the Cameri Theatre.

On screen, Shapira was known for her roles in films, including Einayim Gdolot (1974), Hagiga LaEinayim (1975), Hagiga B'Snuker (1975), Belfer (1978) and more. She was also a comedian and performer during the late 1980s and early 1990s, with a popular one-woman show and many appearances at the Saturday night show on the Israeli Channel One.

In 1975, Shapira won Actress of the Year award at the Zefat Film Festival for Hagiga LaEinayim.

Personal life
Shapira was married twice and she had two children. Her eldest son Yoni, was a founding member of the grunge band Zikney Tzfat.

Death
Shapira died following a five-year battle with cancer in Tel Aviv on January 24, 1992, at the age of 45. She was buried at Kiryat Shaul Cemetery.

Filmography

References

External links

1946 births
1992 deaths
People from Ramat Gan
Jewish Israeli actresses
Jewish Israeli comedians
Jewish Israeli musicians
Jewish Israeli writers
Israeli film actresses
Israeli television actresses
Israeli stage actresses
Israeli female comedians
20th-century Israeli actresses
20th-century Israeli comedians
20th-century Israeli women singers
20th-century Israeli women writers
Deaths from cancer in Israel
Burials at Kiryat Shaul Cemetery
Jewish women writers
Jewish women singers